La Rochepot is a commune in France in Bourgogne-Franche-Comté, Côte-d'Or department. It is a part of the canton of Arnay-le-Duc and of the arrondissement of Beaune. It has a hillside castle, converted to a château, on the D973 road between Beaune and Nolay on the way to Saisy.

The INSEE code is 21527.

History
La Rochepot is known for its castle, the Château de la Rochepot. The earliest record of the castle dates back to 1180 when it was called "Château de La Roche Nolay". In 1403, the castle was bought by Regnier Pot, a knight, who renamed it.

The commune of La Rochepot is famous for its winemaking traditions. The primary cultivated grape varieties are Pinot Noir and Chardonnay.

Geography

Climate
La Rochepot has a oceanic climate (Köppen climate classification Cfb).

Population
The population of the commune in 2017 was 291.

Economy
In 2010, of 171 persons of working age (15–64 years old), 120 were regarded as economically active; the economic activity rate was 70,2% compared to 71.9% in  1999. Of the 120 active persons, 115 persons (65 men and 50 women) had a job, five were jobless (3 men and 2 women). Of the 51 economically inactive persons, 14 persons were schoolchildren and students, 24 were retired and 13 were inactive for other reasons.

See also
Communes of the Côte-d'Or department
List of arrondissements of France

References

External links

 Website of Château de la Rochepot
 An article on Château de la Rochepot

Communes of Côte-d'Or
Côte-d'Or communes articles needing translation from French Wikipedia